The 2017 ISAF Sailing World Cup was a series of sailing regattas staged during 2017 season. The series features boats which feature at the Olympics and Paralympics.

Regattas

Results

2.4 Metre

Men's 470

Women's 470

Men's 49er

Women's 49er FX

Men's Finn

Men's Formula Kite

Men's Laser

Women's Laser Radial

Mixed Nacra 17

Men's RS:X

Women's RS:X

References

External links
 Official website

2017
2017 in sailing